The South Africa national cricket team toured Australia in the 2001–02 cricket season. South Africa played three Test matches against Australia, and also contested the 2001–02 VB Series, a triangular One Day International tournament that also involved New Zealand.

Australia won all three Tests convincingly. However, South Africa atoned for this by winning the VB Series, beating New Zealand in the final.

Series summary

1st Test

2nd Test

3rd Test

See also
2001–02 VB Series

External sources
 CricketArchive

References
 Playfair Cricket Annual
 Wisden Cricketers Almanack

2001 in South African cricket
2002 in South African cricket
2001 in Australian cricket
2002 in Australian cricket
2001–02 Australian cricket season
2001-02
International cricket competitions in 2001–02